The list of shipwrecks in 1938 includes ships sunk, foundered, grounded, or otherwise lost during 1938.

January

1 January

2 January

3 January

4 January

6 January

11 January

13 January

14 January

15 January

17 January

18 January

19 January

20 January

21 January

24 January

25 January

28 January

30 January

31 January

February

1 February

3 February

4 February

7 February

8 February

10 February

11 February

12 February

13 February

14 February

17 February

19 February

20 February

21 February

28 February

Unknown date

March

1 March

2 March

5 March

6 March

8 March

9 March

10 March

12 March

14 March

19 March

20 March

24 March

25 March

28 March

30 March

31 March

April

1 April

2 April

3 April

4 April

6 April

7 April

8 April

9 April

10 April

11 April

13 April

21 April

22 April

26 April

29 April

30 April

May

1 May

2 May

4 May

5 May

8 May

10 May

15 May

16 May

18 May

19 May

22 May

23 May

25 May

27 May

28 May

29 May

30 May

31 May

Unknown date

June

1 June

2 June

3 June

7 June

9 June

10 June

11 June

15 June

21 June

22 June

27 June

28 June

29 June

Unknown date

July

1 July

2 July

3 July

5 July

9 July

11 July

13 July

15 July

19 July

20 July

21 July

23 July

25 July

26 July

27 July

29 July

30 July

August

1 August

2 August

3 August

6 August

7 August

9 August

12 August

13 August

14 August

15 August

17 August

18 August

19 August

20 August

23 August

26 August

28 August

31 August

Unknown date

September

1 September

5 September

7 September

9 September

11 September

12 September

13 September

14 September

16 September

17 September

19 September

21 September

22 September

23 September

24 September

26 September

27 September

28 September

29 September

30 September

October

1 October

2 October

3 October

4 October

6 October

8 October

9 October

13 October

14 October

15 October

16 October

17 October

18 October

19 October

20 October

21 October

22 October

23 October

24 October

25 October

26 October

27 October

28 October

29 October

30 October

Unknown date

November

2 November

4 November

5 November

6 November

7 November

9 November

11 November

12 November

14 November

15 November

17 November

18 November

19 November

21 November

22 November

23 November

24 November

26 November

27 November

28 November

29 November

Unknown date

December

1 December

3 December

4 December

5 December

8 December

11 December

13 December

17 December

18 December

19 December

20 December

22 December

23 December

26 December

27 December

30 December

31 December

Unknown date

Unknown date

References

1938
 
Ships